The Rawson Plateau is an ice-covered plateau,  long and  high, rising between the heads of Bowman Glacier, Moffett Glacier and Steagall Glacier in the Queen Maud Mountains. It was mapped by the Byrd Antarctic Expedition (ByrdAE), 1928–30, and by the U.S. Geological Survey from surveys and from U.S. Navy air photos, 1960–64, and named for Kennett L. Rawson, a contributor to the ByrdAE, 1928–30, and a member of the ByrdAE, 1933–35.

References
 

Plateaus of Antarctica
Landforms of the Ross Dependency
Amundsen Coast